Veľké Zlievce is a village and municipality in the Veľký Krtíš District of the Banská Bystrica Region of southern Slovakia.

External links
 
 
https://web.archive.org/web/20070513023228/http://www.statistics.sk/mosmis/eng/run.html

Villages and municipalities in Veľký Krtíš District